The FNRS-3 or FNRS III is a bathyscaphe of the French Navy. It is currently preserved at Toulon. She set world depth records, competing against a more refined version of her design, the Trieste. The French Navy eventually replaced her with the bathyscaphe FNRS-4, in the 1960s.

After damage to the FNRS-2 during its sea trials in 1948, the Fonds National de la Recherche Scientifique (FNRS) ran out of funding, and the submersible was sold to the French Navy, in 1950. She was subsequently substantially rebuilt and improved at Toulon naval base, and renamed FNRS-3. She was relaunched in 1953, under the command of Georges Houot, a French naval officer.

On 15 February 1954, she made a  dive 160 miles off Dakar, Senegal, in the Atlantic Ocean, beating Piccard's 1953 record, set by the Trieste, by 900 meters. (The floor of the Mediterranean off Naples) This record was not exceeded until a workup dive by Trieste in 1959, working up to the record shattering Challenger Deep dive.

See also
 Trieste
 Trieste II 
 Archimède

References

External links

"13,000 Feet Under the Sea in the French Bathyscaphe". Popular Mechanics. May 1954. pp. 110–111.

Deep-submergence vehicles
Submarines of the French Navy
Ships built in France
Trieste-class deep-submergence vehicle
Museum ships in France